This list is of the Places of Scenic Beauty of Japan located within the Prefecture of Ōita.

National Places of Scenic Beauty
As of 1 December 2022, six Places have been designated at a national level.

Prefectural Places of Scenic Beauty
As of 1 May 2022, six Places have been designated at a prefectural level.

Municipal Places of Scenic Beauty
As of 1 May 2022, twenty-two Places have been designated at a municipal level.

Registered Places of Scenic Beauty
As of 1 June 2022, eight Monuments have been registered (as opposed to designated) as Places of Scenic Beauty at a national level, including Shiramizu Falls, which spans the prefectural borders with Kumamoto.

See also
 Cultural Properties of Japan
 List of parks and gardens of Ōita Prefecture
 List of Historic Sites of Japan (Ōita)

References

External links
  Cultural Properties in Ōita Prefecture

Tourist attractions in Ōita Prefecture
Places of Scenic Beauty

ja:Category:大分県にある国指定の名勝